Seputih River is a river in Lampung province, southern Sumatra, Indonesia, about 200 km northwest of the capital Jakarta.

Geography
The river flows in the southeast area of Sumatra with predominantly tropical rainforest climate (designated as Af in the Köppen-Geiger climate classification). The annual average temperature in the area is 25 °C. The warmest month is September, when the average temperature is around 27 °C, and the coldest is February, at 24 °C. The average annual rainfall is 3176 mm. The wettest month is December, with an average of 501 mm rainfall, and the driest is September, with 33 mm rainfall.

See also
List of rivers of Indonesia
List of rivers of Sumatra

References

Rivers of Lampung
Rivers of Indonesia